Interval may refer to:

Mathematics and physics
 Interval (mathematics), a range of numbers
Partially ordered set#Intervals, its generalization from numbers to arbitrary partially ordered sets
 A statistical level of measurement
 Interval estimate
 Interval (graph theory)
 Space-time interval, the distance between two points in 4-space

Arts and entertainment

Dramatic arts
 Intermission, (British English: interval), a break in a theatrical performance
 Entr'acte, a French term for the same, but used in English often to mean a musical performance played during the break
 Interval (play), a 1939 play by Sumner Locke Elliott
 Interval (film), a 1973 film starring Merle Oberon

Music
 Interval (music), the relationship in pitch between two notes
 Intervals (band), a Canadian progressive metal band
 Intervals (See You Next Tuesday album), 2008
 Intervals (Ahmad Jamal album), 1980

Sport
 Playing time (cricket)#Intervals, the breaks between play in cricket
 Interval training, a training technique used by runners and cyclists

Other uses
 Interval Research Corporation, a technology think tank founded by Paul Allen
 Recess (break), a break between classes, also called "interval" in New Zealand
 Jerry Interval (1923–2006), American portrait photographer and educator

See also
 Intermission (disambiguation)
 InterVol, a UK volunteering charity
 Interval scheduling, a class of problems in computer science